Maravillas Rojo Torrecilla (born November 9, 1950) is a Spanish politician. She is the current Secretary General for Employment in the Government of Spain.

Rojo was born in Barcelona (Spain).  She earned a Bachelor's degree in political, economical, and commercial sciences from the University of Barcelona in 1973. She is married and has two children.

She has promoted many employment policies and has been member of several official bodies including: Barcelona Activa, Agencia de Desarrollo Local de Barcelona, Mercabarna, Consorcio de Turismo de Barcelona, Consorcio de la Zona Franca, Consejo de Administración de la Autoridad Portuaria de Barcelona.

References

1950 births
Living people
University of Barcelona alumni
Politicians from Barcelona
21st-century Spanish politicians
21st-century Spanish women politicians